A +1 (pronounced "plus one") is a person who accompanies someone to an event. The term may also refer to:

Arts, entertainment, and media
 +1 (album), 2008, by Kaela Kimura
 +1 (film) (also known as Plus One), 2013
 "+1" (song), by French DJ Martin Solveig
 +1 Records, an extension of the music management, publicity & marketing company +1 Music
 +1 (also known as Plus One), a "lifeline" in the Who Wants to Be a Millionaire? franchise

Technology
 +1 button, the "like" button implemented by Google applications
 +1, the country calling code (telephone calling prefix) for countries in the North American Dialing Plan, for the list of codes, see list of North American Numbering Plan area codes
 +1, a suffix attached to the name of a television timeshift channel

See also
 1-up
 And 1 (disambiguation)
 Hear, hear
 Infinity + 1
 Me Too (disambiguation)
 One (disambiguation)
 OnePlus
 Plus One (disambiguation)
 Successor function
 UTC+01:00, a time offset one hour ahead of Coordinated Universal Time